Discogobio propeanalis is a fish species in the genus Discogobio endemic to the Shundianhe, a tributary of the Red River in China.

References

External links 

Cyprinid fish of Asia
Fish described in 2008
Discogobio